Andrew John Barnes (born 31 March 1967) is a retired footballer who played for Sutton United, Crystal Palace and Carlisle United.

References

1967 births
Living people
Association football forwards
Footballers from Croydon
English footballers
Sutton United F.C. players
Crystal Palace F.C. players
Carlisle United F.C. players